Acta Germanica is a scholarly yearbook edited by the Association for German Studies in Southern Africa (SAGV, German: Germanistenverband im Südlichen Afrika). It publishes articles and book reviews in the fields of German language and literature, the teaching of German as a second language, and comparative studies in the relation of Germany to Africa.
The yearbook accepts contributions in both German and English.

The print edition is published by the Peter Lang Publishing Group. Full text issues since 2000 are available online. Online access is free to authors and SAGV members. Subscription information for libraries is available at the SAGV website and the online edition home page.

References

External links 
 Online edition home page
 Home page at Peter Lang Publishing Group
 View the latest table of content for this journal and subscribe to the RSS news feed

Germanic philology journals
Academic journals associated with learned and professional societies
Multilingual journals